Carlisle Township is a township in Otter Tail County, Minnesota, United States. The population was 219 as of the 2000 census.

Carlisle Township was organized in 1881.

Geography

Demographics
As of the census of 2000, there were 219 people, 71 households, and 59 families living in the township.  The population density was 6.3 people per square mile (2.4/km2).  There were 77 housing units at an average density of 2.2/sq mi (0.9/km2).  The racial makeup of the township was 98.17% White, and 1.83% from two or more races. Hispanic or Latino of any race were 1.37% of the population.

There were 71 households, out of which 43.7% had children under the age of 18 living with them, 73.2% were married couples living together, 8.5% had a female householder with no husband present, and 15.5% were non-families. 14.1% of all households were made up of individuals, and 4.2% had someone living alone who was 65 years of age or older.  The average household size was 3.08 and the average family size was 3.43.

In the township the population was spread out, with 33.3% under the age of 18, 7.8% from 18 to 24, 23.7% from 25 to 44, 22.4% from 45 to 64, and 12.8% who were 65 years of age or older.  The median age was 38 years. For every 100 females, there were 100.9 males.  For every 100 females age 18 and over, there were 105.6 males.

The median income for a household in the township was $41,500, and the median income for a family was $48,438. Males had a median income of $28,750 versus $20,000 for females. The per capita income for the township was $15,094.  None of the population or families were below the poverty line.

References

Townships in Otter Tail County, Minnesota
Townships in Minnesota